An ultra low temperature (ULT) freezer is a refrigerator that stores contents at between . An ultra low temperature freezer is commonly referred to as a "minus 80 freezer" or a "negative 80 freezer", referring to the most common temperature standard. ULT freezers come in upright and chest freezer formats.

Application

Biological samples in ULT freezers are often stored in polymer tubes and microtubes, generally inside storage boxes that are commonly made of cardboard, polymer plastics or other materials. Microtubes are placed in storage boxes containing a grid of dividers that typically permit 64, 81, or 100 tubes to be stored. Standard ULT freezers can store approximately 350 to 450 microtube boxes.

ULT freezers are widely used in fish and meat preservation. The tuna fishing industry requires the use of ULT freezers.

ULT freezers are commonly fitted with alarm systems that will remotely alert designated parties in the case of a freezer failure.

Pull down time
The time strongly depends on the type of insulation, the efficiency of the compressor system as well as the installed metal shelves within the freezer. At the start of the twenty-first century, ULT freezers were able to cool down within 3 to 5 hours. Warm up time is typically 1/8 °C per minute.

Energy consumption
Due to the low temperature, ULT freezers consume high amounts of electric energy and hence are expensive to operate.  In 2010, Stanford University had more than 2,000 ULT freezers, which used an estimated 40 billion BTUs of energy and cost the university $5.6 million annually.  Newer ULT freezers consume less energy. Nonetheless, a comprehensive report published in 2015 by the Center for Energy Efficient Laboratories (funded by Pacific Gas & Electric, Southern California Edison, and San Diego Gas & Electric utility companies as part of their Emerging Technologies program) found that laboratories in California consumed an estimated 800 GWh/year, with ULT freezers being the greatest contributor to that total.

In recent years, some scientists have begun suggesting that laboratories set freezers to –70 °C instead of –80 °C to conserve energy and decrease wear on the freezer's compressor.

Depending on the volume of the freezer, the opening frequency of the users as well as the number of samples, the energy consumption starts from ca. 11 kWh/day and higher.  To reduce the energy consumption, the insulation should be as efficient as possible.  Additional inner doors reduce the loss of temperature when opening the main door.  Icing within the ULT freezer should be reduced to a minimum.  Modern ULT freezers employ variable speed drives for both the compressors and fans.  This has reduced energy consumption a further 30% to typically 8.5 kWh/day.

Refrigeration cycle
ULT freezers that employ the cascade refrigeration (CR) system use up to 20 times the energy footprint of household fridges, and used to refrigerate with greenhouse gas fluids (typically hydrofluorocarbon R-508B).  Modern ULT freezers employ HC (i.e., hydrocarbon) gas mixtures: typically, ethane and propane.  This has also improved their efficiency by up to 30% over the conventional CFC or HFC gassed freezers.

See also
 Dry ice

References

Cooling technology
 
Preservation methods